Landry Giresse Mouangue Otele, known as Otele Mouangue (born 5 February 1989) is a Cameroonian former footballer.

External links
 

1989 births
Living people
Cameroonian footballers
Association football forwards
FC Wil players
FC Luzern players
FC Aarau players
Union Douala players
Swiss Super League players
Swiss Challenge League players
Cameroonian expatriate footballers
Expatriate footballers in Switzerland
Cameroonian expatriate sportspeople in Switzerland
Cameroon A' international footballers
2011 African Nations Championship players